Defeated Creek is a stream in Knott County, Kentucky, in the United States.

The stream is a tributary to Carr Creek Lake.

See also
List of rivers of Kentucky

References

Rivers of Knott County, Kentucky
Rivers of Kentucky